Viborg Amt is a former county (Danish: amt) in the north-central part of the Jutland peninsula in western Denmark. The county was abolished on 1 January 2007, when most of it merged into Region Midtjylland (i.e. Region Central Jutland). A smaller portion merged into Region Nordjylland (Region North Jutland).

List of County Mayors

List of County Governors
 Florian Martensen-Larsen (1970–1981)
 Jørgen Hansen Koch (1981–1987)
 Karl Johan Christensen (1988–1995)
 Bent Klinte (1995–2004)
 Erik Møller (2004–2006)

Municipalities (1970–2006)

References

Former counties of Denmark (1970–2006)
Central Denmark Region
North Jutland Region